Chief Wale Ogunyemi, OFR (12 August 1939–December 2001) was a Nigerian veteran seasoned dramatist, film actor, prolific playwright , and Yoruba language scholar

Early life
Ogunyemi was born on 12 August 1939 at Igbajo, a city in Osun State, southwestern Nigeria to Samuel Adeosun and Mary Ogunyemi .
He attended the University of Ibadan in 1967 for a year course in drama, the same year he was appointed as a research assistant at Ibadan Institute of African Studies where he later retired.

Career
Ogunyemi began his acting career as a seasonal actor with the new western Nigerian television service in the early 1960s.
He later worked with professor Wole Soyinka, a Nobel Laureate and became a foundation member of Soyinka Orisun Theatre.
His credible performance made him a choice for the role he played as "The bale" in The Lion and the Jewel and Dende in Kongi's Harvest by professor Wole Soyinka.
He also featured in The Beatification Of Area Boy, a play by Wole Soyinka premiered at the West Yorkshire Playhouse in 1995. 
He had written and co-scripted several drama before his death in December 2001.

Filmography
The Lion and the Jewel 
Kongi's Harvest
Sango (1997)
The Beatification Of Area Boy
The Ijaye War (1970) 
Kiriji (1976)
The Divorce (1975)
Aare Akogun (1968) and Everyman *Eniyan, published in 1987)
Langbodo (1979)

Awards
Member of the Order of the Niger awarded in 1982 by the president of the Federal Republic of Nigeria
 Majeobaje of Okuku, a chieftaincy title conferred on him by the Olokuku of Okukuland

References

1939 births
2001 deaths
Nigerian male film actors
Members of the Order of the Niger
Nigerian dramatists and playwrights
People from Osun State
Male actors from Osun State
Yoruba dramatists and playwrights
Yoruba male actors
20th-century Nigerian male actors
Yoruba-language writers
Male actors in Yoruba cinema
20th-century Nigerian dramatists and playwrights
Nigerian male television actors
University of Ibadan alumni